Khopor is a rural locality (a selo) in Rugudzhinsky Selsoviet, Gunibsky District, Republic of Dagestan, Russia. The population was 44 as of 2010.

Geography 
Khopor is located 14 km southwest of Gunib (the district's administrative centre) by road, on the Shabil-Alitl River. Khutni and Rugudzha are the nearest rural localities.

References 

Rural localities in Gunibsky District